The Chaloupe River (Shallop River) is a  river of the Côte-Nord region of Quebec. It flows from north to south and empties into the Gulf of Saint Lawrence.

Location

The mouth of the  Chaloupe River is halfway between Sept-Îles and Havre-Saint-Pierre.
It flows from north to south.
The river can only be navigated in small craft.
Tributaries include the Guillaume, Vibert and Robichaud rivers, which are all small.
The mouth of the Chaloupe River is in the municipality of Rivière-au-Tonnerre in the Minganie Regional County Municipality.
The hamlet of Rivière-à-la-Chaloupe is on the east of the river's estuary.

Name

A chaloupe[fr] is a small French boat such as a lug-rigged fishing boat.
The Abbé Huard visited the hamlet of La Chaloupe on the east shore at the end of the 19th century.
When he asked what the name meant, he was told it was a river with greater volume than the Rivière aux Graines [nearby to the west], and it is precise to call it the Rivière Chaloupe. 
He added that boats of this type were much used in these parts, and found an excellent harbor there.
An English variant of the name is Shallop River.

Description

The Dictionnaire des rivières et lacs de la province de Québec (1914) describes the river as,

Terrain

The Goldthwait Sea deposited large amounts of clay and silt on the plain, later covered by deltaic sandy sediments.
The bedrock is undeformed  magmatic rock.
The north part is an anorthositic massif. 
The south is granitoid orthopyroxene and an assemblage of granite and pegmatite. 
An old U-shaped valley in the north of the watershed holds some glaciofluvial deposits.

Basin

The Chaloupe River basin is partially in the unorganized territory of Lac-Jérôme (74.8%), partly in the municipality of Rivière-au-Tonnerre (25.2%).
It lies between the basins of the Manitou River to the west and the Sheldrake River to the east.
The  Lake Vibert, at the source of the Vibert River, is the only lake of any size.
Water bodies cover 2.37 of the river basin, and ombrotrophic peatlands cover 2.18%.

The streams and rivers follow angular courses dictated by fractures in the bedrock, with straight line sections and right-angled junctions.
In the downstream section of the Chaloupe in the south of the piedmont section the river winds through its alluvial sediments, and in the coastal plain it meanders.
There is a  estuary at the river mouth with several channels and shoals.

Environment

A map of the ecological regions of Quebec shows the river in sub-regions 6j-T and 6m-T of the east spruce/moss subdomain.
Black spruce (Picea mariana) dominate the forests on the coastal plain, while the piedmont area has mixed black spruce and balsam fir (Abies balsamea).
In the past there has been heavy logging in the lower part of the river basin.
In the late 1990s and early 2000s there was a major infestation of hemlock looper (Lambdina fiscellaria) moths, which caused large scale defoliation of the firs.
Fish in the river consist of brook trout (Salvelinus fontinalis), American eel (Anguilla rostrata) and rainbow smelt (Osmerus mordax).

There is no wildlife sanctuary, controlled use zone or outfitter in the watershed.
The Aire de concentration d'oiseaux aquatiques de la Rivière aux Graines, Anse à Georges (River Aux Graines – George's Cove water fowl gathering area), a  IUCN Management Category IV protected area, extends along the coast at the river mouth and includes the estuary.

Notes

Sources

Rivers of Côte-Nord